Gamenauts is an independent game development studio based in Silicon Valley and founded in September 2005 by Stanley Adrianus, formerly of Yahoo! Games.

In 2012, the company announced a publishing initiative for indie Asian developers, signing up studios from South East Asia such as Kurechii Studio, Menara Games, Artlogic Games and Nerdook Productions to publish their mobile titles for the worldwide market.

Games 
 King's League: Odyssey (Publisher) - iOS, 2013
 Nuclear Outrun (Publisher) - iOS, 2013 
 Castle Champions (Publisher) - iOS, 2013 
 Ninja Fishing - iOS & Android, 2011
 Stickbound - iOS, 2010
 Wonder Island - PC, 2010
 Cate West: The Velvet Keys - PC, 2009
 Restaurant Rush - PC & Mobile, 2008
 Cate West: The Vanishing Files - PC, DS & Wii, 2008
 Burger Rush PC & Mobile, 2007
 Spacebound - PC, 2006

References

External links
 Gamenauts Official Website

Video game companies of the United States
Video game development companies
Casual games
Companies based in Silicon Valley